Littoraria flava is a species of sea snail, a marine gastropod mollusk in the family Littorinidae, the winkles or periwinkles.

Distribution
Littoraria flava is currently distributed from the Caribbean to Brazil, including Cuba, Venezuela, Jamaica, Puerto Rico, Guadeloupe, St. Vincent and the Grenadines, Trinidad & Tobago, Guyana and Suriname. Its range is from 22.07°N to 29°S; 81°W to 34.9°W.

Description
The maximum recorded shell length is 20 mm.

Habitat
Minimum recorded depth is -1.5 m. Maximum recorded depth is 0 m.

References

 Reid D.G. (1989) The comparative morphology, phylogeny and evolution of the gastropod family Littorinidae. Philosophical Transactions of the Royal Society B 324: 1-110

External links

Littorinidae
Gastropods described in 1832